Chemical Invasion is the second studio album by German thrash metal band Tankard, released in October 1987.

Reception
Reviews have been "generally positive" after its release. A review from Rock Hard gave it a high review, praising it as an improvement over their debut album; Stating how it's far better in terms of songwriting and playing technique. "Chemical Invasion is certainly anything but boring," they claimed while also praising the riffs, powerful rhythm work, and Gerre's merciless bawling as giving the nine songs character.

Track listing

Personnel
Andreas "Gerre" Geremia - vocals 
Andy Boulgaropoulos - guitars
Axel Katzmann  - guitars
Frank Thorwarth - bass, backing vocals
Oliver Werner - drums

References

External Sites
 

1987 albums
Tankard (band) albums
Noise Records albums
Albums produced by Harris Johns